In enzymology, a xanthoxin dehydrogenase is an enzyme that catalyzes the chemical reaction

xanthoxin + NAD+  abscisic aldehyde + NADH + H+

Thus, the two substrates of this enzyme are xanthoxin and NAD+, whereas its 3 products are abscisic aldehyde, NADH, and H+.

This enzyme belongs to the family of oxidoreductases, specifically those acting on the CH-OH group of donor with NAD+ or NADP+ as acceptor. The systematic name of this enzyme class is xanthoxin:NAD+ oxidoreductase. Other names in common use include xanthoxin oxidase, and ABA2. This enzyme participates in carotenoid biosynthesis.

References

 
 
 

EC 1.1.1
NADH-dependent enzymes
Enzymes of unknown structure